Waldhambach may refer to:
 Waldhambach, Bas-Rhin, France
 Waldhambach, Rhineland-Palatinate, Germany